The 2013–14 Vermont Catamounts men's basketball team represented the University of Vermont during the 2013–14 NCAA Division I men's basketball season. The Catamounts, led by third year head coach John Becker, played their home games at Patrick Gym and were members of the America East Conference. They finished the season 22–11, 15–1 in America East play to win the America East regular season championship. They advanced to the semifinals of the America East Conference tournament where they lost to Albany. As a regular season conference champion who failed to win their conference tournament, the received an automatic bid to the National Invitation Tournament where they lost in the first round to Georgia.

Roster

Schedule

|-
!colspan=9 style="background:#008000; color:#FFD700;"| Exhibition

|-
!colspan=9 style="background:#008000; color:#FFD700;"| Regular season

|-
!colspan=9 style="background:#008000; color:#FFD700;"| America East tournament

|-
!colspan=9 style="background:#008000; color:#FFD700;"| NIT

References

Vermont Catamounts men's basketball seasons
Vermont
Vermont
Cat
Cat